Kanye West presidential campaign may refer to:

Kanye West 2020 presidential campaign
Kanye West 2024 presidential campaign